La Luchadora is a professional wrestling character who appeared in WWE between December 2016 and January 2017. It is based on a Mexican female luchador. Originally portrayed by professional wrestler Becky Lynch, La Luchadora was portrayed by three other wrestlers, Alexa Bliss, Mickie James, and Deonna Purrazzo.

Character history 

On the December 20, 2016, episode of SmackDown Live, the La Luchadora character was introduced during a match against the SmackDown Women's Champion Alexa Bliss in which Bliss was defeated. After the match, it was revealed that Becky Lynch was under La Luchadora persona. On the December 27 episode of SmackDown Live,  La Luchadora, this time being portrayed by independent wrestler Deonna Purrazzo, turned heel during a match for the SmackDown Women's Championship between Bliss and Lynch, distracting and attacking Lynch and subsequently costing her the match.

On the January 3, 2017 episode of SmackDown Live, Lynch defeated La Luchadora in a singles match. Following the match, the character was unmasked and it was revealed that Bliss portrayed the character during the match before the evil Deonna Purrazzo appeared as a second Luchadora and attacked Lynch with help of Alexa. On the January 17, 2017 episode of SmackDown Live, the evil La Luchadora returned during a steel cage match for the SmackDown Women's Championship between Bliss and Lynch, where she once again distracted and attacked Lynch, leading to Bliss retaining. After the match it was revealed that the returning Mickie James was under La Luchadora persona and officially allied with Bliss, making it the last appearance for the La Luchadora gimmick.

Portrayers 
 Becky Lynch – The original portrayer of La Luchadora.
 Deonna Purrazzo - Appeared as a heel La Luchadora and attacked Becky Lynch on the December 27, 2016 episode of SmackDown Live. 
 Alexa Bliss – Wrestled as La Luchadora on the January 3, 2017 episode of SmackDown Live, losing to Becky Lynch.
 Mickie James – Revealed as the attacker under La Luchadora persona.

See also 
 Doink the Clown
 El Gran Luchadore
 Los Conquistadores
 The Executioner

References 

Masked wrestlers
Professional wrestling gimmicks